Elena Denchtchik  (born 11 November 1973) is a former Russian women's international footballer who played as a midfielder. She was a member of the Russia women's national football team. She was part of the team at the 2003 FIFA Women's World Cup.

References

1973 births
Living people
Russian women's footballers
Russia women's international footballers
Place of birth missing (living people)
2003 FIFA Women's World Cup players
Women's association football midfielders
21st-century Russian women
Russian Women's Football Championship players